Valentina Asenova (born 5 February 1991) is a Bulgarian footballer who plays as a midfielder for Women's National Championship club FC NSA Sofia and captains the Bulgaria women's national team.

Club career
Asenova has played for NSA Sofia in Bulgaria.

International career
Asenova capped for Bulgaria at senior level during the UEFA Women's Euro 2013 qualifying and the 2015 FIFA Women's World Cup qualification.

References

1991 births
Living people
Bulgarian women's footballers
Women's association football midfielders
FC NSA Sofia players
Bulgaria women's international footballers